Ricardo Udler Cymerman is a Bolivian gynaecologist. He currently serves as Chairman of the Israelite Club of Bolivia and acts as leader of the Jewish community of Bolivia in general.

Udler was born in La Paz, a city that is home to much of the country's small Jewish community. He is Chairman of the Israelite Club of Bolivia, an entity that brings together the Bolivian Jewish community. Today, the Jewish community of Bolivia is made only by about 500 members, making it one of the smallest Jewish communities in South America.

He is also notable for defending the Jewish community of anti-Semitic acts that have taken place in recent years during the administration of President Evo Morales.

See also
 History of the Jews in Bolivia

References

External links
 The Jewish World: Bolivia

Bolivian Jews
Bolivian gynaecologists
Jewish physicians
People from La Paz